Joseph Francis Giannini (September 8, 1888 – September 26, 1942) was a shortstop in Major League Baseball who played briefly for the Boston Red Sox during the  season. A native of Drytown, California, he was signed by Boston out of the University of San Francisco.

Giannini was a major leaguer whose career, statistically speaking, was only slightly different from that of Eddie Gaedel or Moonlight Graham. He appeared in one game and hit a double in two at-bats for a .500 average, without runs or RBI. As a fielder, he collected two assists and committed two errors for a .909 fielding percentage.
 
Giannini died in San Francisco, California, at age 54.

Sources
Baseball Reference

Boston Red Sox players
Major League Baseball shortstops
San Francisco Dons baseball players
American people of Italian descent
Baseball players from California
1888 births
1942 deaths
Brockton Shoemakers players
Sacramento Wolves players
Mission Wolves players